Izoria is a village and council located in the municipality of Aiara, in Álava province, Basque Country, Spain. As of 2020, it has a population of 164.

Geography 
Izoria is located 45km northwest of Vitoria-Gasteiz.

References

Populated places in Álava